is an American-born Japanese actor.

Biography
He is son of conductor Seiji Ozawa and former model and actress Miki Irie. Essayist Seira Ozawa is his sister, and musician Kenji Ozawa is a cousin. He attended Seijo Gakuen Primary School, Seijo Gakuen Junior High School and High School, and Seijo University. His given name is read as Yukiyoshi but as the kanji for it 征悦 is difficult to read, often incorrectly as Seietsu. On 1 September 2021, he married Maho Kuwako, an announcer at national broadcaster NHK.

Filmography

TV dramas

Films

Stage

Internet drama

Cultural programmes

Narration

Advertisements

Dubbing
The King's Man, Duke of Oxford (Ralph Fiennes)

References

Notes

External links
Yukiyoshi Ozawa at allcinema 

Japanese male stage actors
Japanese people of Russian descent
Seijo University alumni
Male actors from San Francisco
1974 births
Living people